Macho Mustanaa is a 2012 Bengali action and romance film directed by Reshmi Mitra and produced under the banner of Remac Filmz Production. The film features actors Hiran and Pooja in the lead roles. Music of the film has been composed by Samidh Mukerjee.

The movie was loosely inspired from the Telugu film Rechipo (2009).

Plot 
The film commences by showing a happy and united family, consisting of Nabab, his father, grandfather, elder brother and sister-in-law (who was pregnant). One day, Nabab met Diya on the street, and they fell in love with each other. Following this, they had a tough time as Diya's father, Bidhan Chattoraj, hired goons to separate them. Even after spending a lot of time escaping those goons, the goons finally catch them, and Bidhan Chottoraj gets his daughter back. Since that incident, Nabab's life faces a turn as he is accused of false charges and sent to the jail. But Bidhan Chattoraj doesn't stop here. In the fire of vengeance, he decides to demolish Nabab's family. He kills Nabab's elder brother and grandfather, paralyses his father, and finally, his sister-in-law lost her unborn child. Nabab becomes furious upon this. The events that occur next, i.e., through which Nabab gets back Diya and takes revenge on Bidhan Chattoraj, form the climax of the story.

Cast 
 Hiran as Nabab
 Pooja as Diya
 Arun Bannerjee as Bidhan Chattoraj
 Rajat Ganguly as Nabab's father
 Bibhu Bhattacharya as Nabab's grandfather
 Shantilal Mukherjee as a goon
 Dolon Roy as Bidisha Mukherjee
 Debdut Ghosh as Nabab's elder brother
 Arpita Dutta Chowdhury as Nabab's sister-in-law

Soundtrack 

Samidh Mukerjee composed the film score for Macho Mustanaa. Lyrics are penned by Samidh Mukerjee, Priyo Chatterjee and Goutam Susmit.

Track listing

References 

Indian romantic action films
Bengali remakes of Telugu films
Bengali-language Indian films
2010s Bengali-language films
2010s romantic action films